Fletcher Newell (born 1 March 2000 in New Zealand) is a New Zealand rugby union player who plays Prop for the  in Super Rugby and for the All Blacks in international matches.

Biography 
Newell was educated at Rangiora High School.

In 2019, Newell represented New Zealand at the Under 20 Championship in Argentina and was also named New Zealand's Rugby Age Grade Player of the Year. He was a member of the  2020 Mitre 10 Cup squad.

Newell was named in the Crusaders squad and made his debut in the 2021 Super Rugby Aotearoa season.

Newell made his international debut for New Zealand on 13 August 2022 against South Africa at Johannesburg.

Reference list

External links
 Crusaders Profile
 
 

2000 births
New Zealand rugby union players
Living people
Rugby union props
Canterbury rugby union players
Crusaders (rugby union) players
Rugby union players from Canterbury, New Zealand
New Zealand international rugby union players
People educated at Rangiora High School